Angler's Terrace may refer to:

Senkaku Islands, disputed islands in the East China Sea, known in Taiwan as Angler's Terrace
Diaoyutai State Guesthouse, a historic hotel and guesthouse complex in Beijing, China